Sena is a municipality located in the Monegros comarca province of Huesca, Aragon, Spain. According to the 2018 census, the municipality has a population of 489 inhabitants.

There is a Stone Age archaeological site at a place known as "Monte Alto de Sena" located within Sena's municipal term.

References

External links

 Sesa official Site
 Information on Sena

 auto

Municipalities in the Province of Huesca